Randolph is a township in Morris County, New Jersey, United States. As of the 2010 United States census, the township's population was 25,734, reflecting an increase of 887 (+3.6%) from the 24,847 counted in the 2000 census, which had in turn increased by 4,873 (+24.4%) from the 19,974 counted in the 1990 census.

According to the 2010 Census, Randolph was the 3rd most-populous municipality in Morris County and its  land area is the 8th largest in the county. The New Jersey State Planning Commission designates Randolph as half rural, half suburban. The community maintains a diverse population of nearly 26,000 residents.

In 2013, in the Coldwell Banker edition of “Best Places to Live in New Jersey for Booming Suburbs,” Randolph was the number one ranked town in Morris County and fourth overall in the state citing "job growth, high percentage of home ownership, good schools, access to local shopping and community safety." Niche.com ranked Randolph amongst the Top 50 in its 2019 rankings of the "Best Places to Live" in New Jersey.

History 

The earliest known inhabitants of what is now Randolph were the Lenni Lenape Native Americans. The earliest European settlers of what is now Randolph were Quakers and one of the pioneering landowners was Hartshorne Fitz-Randolph, who purchased  of what would become the township in the Mine Hill area in 1753, later becoming the namesake of the township. New Jersey's first iron mine was established in Randolph in 1713, and for hundreds of years the mines fostered the development of the township, providing the raw materials for weapons used by the Continental Army during the American Revolutionary War. During the war, the area was a supply point for George Washington's army during their winter encampment in nearby Jockey Hollow.

Randolph was incorporated as a township by an act of the New Jersey Legislature on January 1, 1806, from portions of Mendham Township. Portions of the township were taken on April 1, 1869, to create Dover Town within the township, which became an independent municipality as of March 5, 1896. Other portions of the township were taken to create Port Oram (June 26, 1895, now Wharton), Mine Hill Township (March 2, 1923) and Victory Gardens (June 20, 1951). The creation of Victory Gardens created a small triangular exclave of the township, surrounded by Victory Gardens to the southeast and Dover to the northwest.

Randolph became a vacation haven in the early part of the 20th century, known for its woods, ponds, lakes and air. Through the 1950s, farms, large hotels and bungalow colonies dotted the community. Performers such as Phil Silvers, and Frank Sinatra appeared at the hotels.  Boxers Max Baer, Floyd Patterson, James J. Braddock and Rocky Marciano trained or fought at the Saltz Hotel.

Landmarks
Randolph's township historical landmarks include the 1869 Bryant Distillery (famed for its applejack) and the 1924 Millbrook School, now rehabilitated and in use as offices. The Liberty Tree (which dated back to 1720) was also one of the town landmarks until its removal due to deterioration on August 31, 2018.

The Randolph Historical Society has preserved the township's historical heritage in the Museum of Old Randolph. One of Randolph's oldest streets, Gristmill Road, is on the National Register of Historic Places.

Geography
According to the United States Census Bureau, the township had a total area of 21.16 square miles (54.81 km2), including 20.91 square miles (54.14 km2) of land and 0.26 square miles (0.67 km2) of water (1.22%).

Randolph Township has been designated half rural, half suburban by the New Jersey State Planning Commission.

Unincorporated communities, localities and place names located partially or completely within the township include Black River Pond, Calais, Center Grove, Fernbrook, Ironia, Mill Brook, Mount Fern, Mount Freedom, Shongum and Youngstown.

Situated upstream of the Black River, the South Branch of the Raritan River, the Whippany River and the Rockaway River, the hills of Randolph attracted settlers and its streams provided power for industry.

The township is a suburb of New York City. Randolph borders the Morris County municipalities of Mine Hill, Dover, Rockaway Township and Victory Gardens to the north, Mendham Township to the south, Denville Township and Morris Township to the east, Chester Township to the southwest and Roxbury to the west.

Geology
The township is located within the New Jersey Highlands, one of New Jersey's four major physiographic provinces. Part of the Appalachian Mountains, the Highlands are characterized by alternating flat-topped ridges and deep-striking valleys.

Climate
On average, the warmest month is July. The highest recorded temperature was 102 °F in 1953. On average, the coolest month is January, while the maximum average precipitation occurs in September. The lowest recorded temperature was −24 °F in 1943.

Demographics
{{US Census population
| 1810=  1271
| 1820=  1252
| 1830=  1443
| 1840=  1801
| 1850=  2632
| 1860=  3173
| 1870=  5111
| 1880=  7700
| 1890=  7972
| 1900=  2246 | 1900n=*
| 1910=  2307
| 1920=  2509
| 1930=  2165 | 1930n=*
| 1940=  2160
| 1950=  4293
| 1960=  7295 | 1960n=*
| 1970= 13296
| 1980= 17828
| 1990= 19974
| 2000= 24847
| 2010= 25734
| 2020= 26504
| estimate=26480
| estyear=2021
| estref=
| footnote=Population sources:<small> 1800–19201840 1850–1870<ref>Raum, John O. [https://books.google.com/books?id=5qZ4AAAAMAAJ&pg=PA268 The History of New Jersey: From Its Earliest Settlement to the Present Time, Volume 1], p. 268, J. E. Potter and company, 1877. Accessed December 22, 2012. "Randolph contained in 1850 2,632 inhabitants; in 1860, 3,173; and in 1870, 5,111."</ref>1850 1870 1880–18901890–1910 1910–19301930–1990 20002010 2020* = Lost territory in previous decade.</small>
}}

2010 Census

The Census Bureau's 2006–2010 American Community Survey showed that (in 2010 inflation-adjusted dollars) median household income was $123,041 (with a margin of error of +/− $7,800) and the median family income was $144,069 (+/− $7,473). Males had a median income of $100,895 (+/− $2,256) versus $65,011 (+/− $5,834) for females. The per capita income for the township was $56,879 (+/− $3,318). About 1.8% of families and 3.3% of the population were below the poverty line, including 1.9% of those under age 18 and 2.7% of those age 65 or over.

2000 Census
As of the 2000 United States census, there were 24,847 people, 8,679 households, and 6,804 families residing in the township.  The population density was 1,185.2 people per square mile (457.7/km2).  There were 8,903 housing units at an average density of 424.7 per square mile (164.0/km2).  The racial makeup of the township was 85.70% White, 2.30% African American, 0.06% Native American, 9.14% Asian, 0.02% Pacific Islander, 1.31% from other races, and 1.46% from two or more races. Hispanic or Latino of any race were 4.86% of the population.DP-1: Profile of General Demographic Characteristics: 2000 - Census 2000 Summary File 1 (SF 1) 100-Percent Data for Randolph township, Morris County, New Jersey , United States Census Bureau. Accessed December 22, 2012.

There were 8,679 households, out of which 44.2% had children under the age of 18 living with them, 70.2% were married couples living together, 6.2% had a female householder with no husband present, and 21.6% were non-families. 18.0% of all households were made up of individuals, and 4.8% had someone living alone who was 65 years of age or older.  The average household size was 2.86 and the average family size was 3.28.

In the township the population was spread out, with 29.7% under the age of 18, 5.2% from 18 to 24, 32.2% from 25 to 44, 25.7% from 45 to 64, and 7.3% who were 65 years of age or older.  The median age was 36 years. For every 100 females, there were 98.3 males.  For every 100 females age 18 and over, there were 95.8 males.

The median income for a household in the township was $97,589, and the median income for a family was $115,722. Males had a median income of $80,120 versus $45,455 for females. The per capita income for the township was $43,072.  About 1.0% of families and 1.4% of the population were below the poverty line, including 1.0% of those under age 18 and 3.4% of those age 65 or over.

Parks and recreation
Facilities include six lighted tennis courts, four lighted softball fields, two lighted basketball courts, a tennis practice wall, a Skate Park, a  paved walking and jogging trail, Brundage Park Playhouse, a playground, a picnic pavilion, a lacrosse/soccer field, a pond (for fishing or ice skating), a softball field, and a multipurpose area for soccer and other field sports.

Facilities include (all lighted): a football field, a lacrosse field (complete with two defibrillators, after a player was hit with a lacrosse ball in the heart), a Little League field, a Babe Ruth baseball field, a multipurpose area, a softball field, a picnic pavilion, a sand volleyball court, and a playground area.

It has a beach. Other facilities include a beach house with a changing room,  a refreshment stand, a picnic facilities, a playground area, a permanent docks for lap swimming,  a volleyball court and a basketball court.

Facilities include 6 soccer fields, 4 Little League/softball fields,  a picnic pavilion,  restrooms, a refreshment stand, and a lake for fishing and ice skating. Soccer tournaments are held here for travel team soccer.

This park is used as a day camp during the summer months (June - August) and is divided by a local street to create east and west sections. Facilities include a field in the western portion, while the eastern portion hosts the day camp with a swimming pool, a small tot-lot, and various buildings for camp activities.

Kiwanis Park contains . Facilities include a playground, an open play area and picnic tables.

Rosenfarb Park facilities include a half-court basketball court and a picnic area.

Hidden Valley Park contains  of rolling hills, a pond and natural walking trails. The township's walking and biking trail cross the site.

Cohen Farm Park consists of an undeveloped . The township's  trail system cuts through the park, connecting to Brundage Park and Freedom Park.

 Government 

 Local government 
The Township Council is the legislative body of Randolph, operating under the Council-Manager form of government within the Faulkner Act, formally known as the Optional Municipal Charter Law. The township is one of 42 municipalities (of the 564) statewide that use this form of government. The Township Council is comprised of seven members, who are elected at-large in partisan elections to four-year terms of office on a staggered basis, with either three or four seats up for election in even-numbered years as part of the November general election. The council selects one of its members to serve as mayor and another as deputy mayor, at a reorganization meeting conducted each year. The council represents the public and develops and adopts policies, resolves public issues, formulates township policy through motions, resolutions and ordinances which reflect the needs of the public, and maintains a working knowledge of intergovernmental issues and how they will affect the Township of Randolph. Thirteen separate advisory boards and committees assist policy formulation of the council. The Township Council is similar to a corporate board of directors and is assisted by the Township Attorney, who prepares ordinances and advises on legal issues, the Township Clerk, who prepares resolutions, and the Township Manager, who functions much like the CEO of a corporation.

, members of the Randolph Township Council are Mayor Marie Potter (R, term on council and as mayor ends December 31, 2022), Deputy Mayor Lou Nisivoccia (R, term on council and as deputy mayor ends 2022), Christine Carey (R, 2024), Mark H. Forstenhausler (R, 2022), James B. Loveys (R, 2022) and Joanne Veech (R, 2024).2022 Municipal Data Sheet, Township of Randolph. Accessed July 7, 2022.Morris County Municipal Elected Officials For The Year 2022, Morris County, New Jersey Clerk, updated March 3, 2022. Accessed May 1, 2022.General Election Winners List For November 6, 2018, Morris County, New Jersey Clerk. Accessed January 1, 2019.

Mark Forstenhausler was selected in February 2014 to fill the vacant seat expiring in December 2014 of Tom MacArthur, who resigned from office after announcing that he was moving out of the township.

 Federal, state and county representation 
Randolph Township is located in the 11th Congressional District and is part of New Jersey's 25th state legislative district.2019 New Jersey Citizen's Guide to Government, New Jersey League of Women Voters. Accessed October 30, 2019.

 

Morris County is governed by a Board of County Commissioners comprised of seven members who are elected at-large in partisan elections to three-year terms on a staggered basis, with either one or three seats up for election each year as part of the November general election. Actual day-to-day operation of departments is supervised by County Administrator, John Bonanni. , Morris County's Commissioners are
Commissioner Director Tayfun Selen (R, Chatham Township, term as commissioner ends December 31, 2023; term as director ends 2022),
Commissioner Deputy Director John Krickus (R, Washington Township, term as commissioner ends 2024; term as deputy director ends 2022),
Douglas Cabana (R, Boonton Township, 2022), 
Kathryn A. DeFillippo (R, Roxbury, 2022),
Thomas J. Mastrangelo (R, Montville, 2022),
Stephen H. Shaw (R, Mountain Lakes, 2024) and
Deborah Smith (R, Denville, 2024).
The county's constitutional officers are the County Clerk and County Surrogate (both elected for five-year terms of office) and the County Sheriff (elected for a three-year term). , they are 
County Clerk Ann F. Grossi (R, Parsippany–Troy Hills, 2023),Clerks, Constitutional Officers Association of New Jersey. Accessed June 1, 2022.
Sheriff James M. Gannon (R, Boonton Township, 2022)Sheriffs, Constitutional Officers Association of New Jersey. Accessed June 1, 2022. and
Surrogate Heather Darling (R, Roxbury, 2024).Surrogates, Constitutional Officers Association of New Jersey. Accessed June 1, 2022.

Politics
As of March 23, 2011, there were a total of 16,398 registered voters in Randolph Township, of which 3,822 (23.3%) were registered as Democrats, 4,895 (29.9%) were registered as Republicans and 7,670 (46.8%) were registered as Unaffiliated. There were 11 voters registered as Libertarians or Greens.

In the 2016 presidential election, Democrat Hillary Clinton received 51.4% of the vote (6,785 cast), ahead of Republican Donald Trump with 45.2% (5,968 votes), and other candidates with 3.4% (455 votes), and the 13,208 ballots cast by the township's 18,760 registered voters resulted in a turnout of 70.4%, with the election being the first time in decades that a Democrat won a plurality of votes in the town. In the 2012 presidential election, Republican Mitt Romney received 53.4% of the vote (6,636 cast), ahead of Democrat Barack Obama with 45.6% (5,662 votes), and other candidates with 1.0% (119 votes), among the 12,479 ballots cast by the township's 17,405 registered voters (62 ballots were spoiled), for a turnout of 71.7%. In the 2008 presidential election, Republican John McCain received 50.7% of the vote (6,745 cast), ahead of Democrat Barack Obama with 48.0% (6,388 votes) and other candidates with 0.9% (116 votes), among the 13,310 ballots cast by the township's 17,158 registered voters, for a turnout of 77.6%. In the 2004 presidential election, Republican George W. Bush received 56.1% of the vote (7,166 ballots cast), outpolling Democrat John Kerry with 43.0% (5,488 votes) and other candidates with 0.5% (90 votes), among the 12,764 ballots cast by the township's 16,944 registered voters, for a turnout percentage of 75.3.

In the 2013 gubernatorial election, Republican Chris Christie received 68.9% of the vote (4,838 cast), ahead of Democrat Barbara Buono with 29.4% (2,065 votes), and other candidates with 1.7% (121 votes), among the 7,103 ballots cast by the township's 17,213 registered voters (79 ballots were spoiled), for a turnout of 41.3%. In the 2009 gubernatorial election, Republican Chris Christie received 58.4% of the vote (4,936 ballots cast), ahead of  Democrat Jon Corzine with 32.5% (2,742 votes), Independent Chris Daggett with 8.3% (697 votes) and other candidates with 0.4% (36 votes), among the 8,445 ballots cast by the township's 16,615 registered voters, yielding a 50.8% turnout.

Education
The Randolph Township Schools educate children in public school for pre-kindergarten through twelfth grade, as well as special-needs preschoolers. As of the 2020–21 school year, the district, comprised of six schools, had an enrollment of 4,314 students and 382.3 classroom teachers (on an FTE basis), for a student–teacher ratio of 11.3:1. Schools in the district (with 2020–21 enrollment data from the National Center for Education Statistics) are 
Center Grove Elementary School with 466 students in grades Pre-K–5, 
Fernbrook Elementary School with 498 students in grades K–5, 
Ironia Elementary School with 436 students in grades K–5, 
Shongum Elementary School with 416 students in grades K–5, 
Randolph Middle School with 1,009 students in grades 6–8 and 
Randolph High School with 1,475 students in grades 9–12.School Performance Reports for the Randolph Township School District, New Jersey Department of Education. Accessed April 25, 2022.

Established in 1968, the main campus of the County College of Morris is located on a  campus in Randolph Township. Rutgers University has a partnership with County College of Morris that allows students who have earned an associate degree to complete a bachelor's degree through the off-campus Rutgers courses taken at the County College of Morris campus in Randolph.

The Gottesman RTW Academy (Formerly Hebrew Academy of Morris County) is a coeducational Jewish day school for students in preschool through eighth grade, serving approximately 225 children. The school has been recognized as a recipient of the National Blue Ribbon School Award by the United States Department of Education.

Transportation

Roads and highways

Route 10, Dover-Chester Road (County Route 513), and Sussex Turnpike (County Route 617) pass through township lines.

Public transportation
The NJ Transit 875 route serves the township.Morris County System Map, NJ Transit. Accessed August 5, 2015.

NJ Transit offered local bus service on the MCM2 and MCM7 routes which were eliminated due to budget constraints.

Community
Randolph has organized events, including high school sports, senior citizen gatherings, and various group activities. The public library schedules reading groups and other programs. Games and socials are held at the Senior Citizen Center at the Brundage Park Playhouse, which presents plays and musicals with youth and adult performers.

Recreation programs are available for children, teenagers and adults.

Summer camps are available for Kindergarteners – Grade 12 in various locations. Organizations are as follows:
Grades K–2: Budding stars theatre camp (Brundage Park Playhouse)
Grades K–5: Summer day camp
Grades 6–8: Teen travel camp
Ages 8–14: Summer stages (Brundage Park Playhouse)
Grades 7–11: Advanced performance workshop (Brundage Park Playhouse)
Grades K–12: Artworks studio summer camp

Notable people

People who were born in, residents of, or otherwise closely associated with Randolph include:

 Bryce Aiken (born 1996), college basketball player for the Seton Hall Pirates
 Bill Armstrong (born 1955), former defensive back who played two seasons with the Hamilton Tiger-Cats of the Canadian Football League
 Frank Beltre (born 1990), defensive lineman who has played for the Calgary Stampeders of the Canadian Football League
 Emily Chang (born 1980), actress who has appeared in The Vampire Diaries Antonio Cromartie (born 1984), professional football player for the New York Jets
 Doug Dale, host of the Comedy Central series TV Funhouse Robby Foley (born 1996), racing driver who competes in the WeatherTech SportsCar Championship
 Sidney Gish (born 1997), singer-songwriter
 Kendra Goodwin (born 1982), ice dancer
 Mike Groh (born 1971), college football coach and former player who is wide receivers coach for the Indianapolis Colts
 Garry Howatt (born 1952), professional hockey player for the New York Islanders, who owned a local golf complex (Mt. Freedom Golf) for 21 years
 Jon Hurwitz (born 1977), screenwriter whose credits include Harold & Kumar Go to White Castle, Scary Movie 3 (rewrite)
 Jennifer Jones (born 1967), dancer and actress, who in 1987 became the first African-American Radio City Music Hall Rockette
 Payal Kadakia (born 1983), founder and chairman of ClassPass
 Liz Katz (born 1988), cosplayer and actress whose credits include Guest House and Borderlands 3 was born and raised in Randolph and graduated from Randolph High School in 2006
 Michael Lansing (born 1994), professional soccer player who plays as a goalkeeper for AC Horsens in the Danish Superliga
 Tom MacArthur (born 1960), businessman and politician who served in the United States House of Representatives for New Jersey's 3rd congressional district from 2015 to 2019 and previously served as Mayor of Randolph
 Amanda Magadan (born 1995), member of the United States women's national field hockey team starting in 2017
 Brendan Mahon (born 1995), guard for the Carolina Panthers of the NFL
 George Parros (born 1979), hockey player for the Montreal Canadiens
 Chris Pennie (born 1977), drummer for The Dillinger Escape Plan and Coheed and Cambria
 Sherry Ross (born ), sports broadcaster and journalist who is a color commentator for the New Jersey Devils radio broadcasts
 Lee Saltz (born 1963), former professional American football quarterback in the National Football League who played for the Detroit Lions and the New England Patriots
 Hayden Schlossberg (born 1978), screenwriter whose credits include Harold & Kumar Go to White Castle, Scary Movie 3 (rewrite)
 Bob Van Dillen (born 1972), meteorologist on HLN's Morning Express with Robin Meade''
 Drew Willy (born 1986), professional quarterback

References

External links

Randolph Township Website
Randolph Township Schools

School Data for the Randolph Township Schools, National Center for Education Statistics
Randolph Township Free Public Library
RandolphLocal.com sponsored by Randolph Township's Economic Development Committee
Randolph-area Chamber of Commerce
County College of Morris web site
Historic 1758 Quaker meetinghouse
Google Map of Randolph Township
Climate Averages

 
1806 establishments in New Jersey
Faulkner Act (council–manager)
Populated places established in 1806
Townships in Morris County, New Jersey